Thomas Samuel Turner III (October 1, 1978 – March 10, 2014) was an American football linebacker who played one season with the New England Patriots of the National Football League (NFL). He was drafted by the New England Patriots in the seventh round of the 2001 NFL Draft. He played college football at Michigan State University and attended Hillsboro High School in Hillsboro, Ohio. Turner died of cancer on March 10, 2014.

References

External links
Just Sports Stats
Michigan State Spartans bio
NFL Draft Scout

1978 births
2014 deaths
Players of American football from Dayton, Ohio
American football linebackers
African-American players of American football
Michigan State Spartans football players
New England Patriots players
Deaths from cancer in Ohio
20th-century African-American sportspeople
21st-century African-American sportspeople